Haacke is a surname. Notable people with the surname include:
Hans Haacke (born 1936), German artist
Julia Haacke (born 1971), German actress
Julian von Haacke (born  1994), German footballer
Wilhelm Haacke (1855–1912), German zoologist

See also
Haacke HFM-2, a German two cylinder flat engine built in the early 1920s
Haacke's rock gecko, or Haacke's flat gecko (Afroedura haackei), is a species of African gecko found in South Africa
Haack

References